Acricotopus is a genus of non-biting midges of the bloodworm family Chironomidae.

Species 
A. lucens (Zetterstedt, 1850)

References

Chironomidae
Nematocera genera
Taxa named by Jean-Jacques Kieffer